Juan Fernández de Rojas (1750–1819) was a Spanish historian, writer and humorist of the School of Salamanca.

Published works
"Dolores Sermon of Father Juan Fernández de Rojas," The City of God, LXXII, 1907, pp. 465–482. [With a foreword signed by the management of journal].
With the pseudonym Francisco Florencio Agustin: Science Crotalogía or castanets. Valencia, printing of the Journal [Valencia], 1792. 5th ed., 111 p. Edic. facsimile, Valencia 1985, Paris Bookseller Valencia.
With the pseudonym Johnny Lopez Polinario: Challenge to literary or scholarly Crotalogía lascastañuelas science. Valencia 1792. 64 p. Edic. facsimile, Valencia 1993, Paris Bookseller Valencia.
With pesudónimo Alejandro Moya: The triumph of castanets or my trip to Crotalópolis. Madrid 1792, González printing. [Access to the text by Miguel de Cervantes Virtual Library].
With the pseudonym Francisco Florencio Agustin: Madama Crotalistris Letter on the Second Part of the Crotalogía. Madrid 1792, Cano Benito printing.
With the pseudonym Cornelius Suarez de Molina: The bird in the league: congratulatory epistle to the translator in the league of modern theology and philosophy. Madrid 1798, office of Don Benito, p. 64.
Fashion book or essay currutacos history, and Madamitas Pirracas of nuevocuño currutaco written by a philosopher. Madrid 1796, Don Blas Roman printing.
The pseudonym Antonia Viqueydi: Illustration, addition or commentary Crotalogía and not ladebida property called science of the castanets. Madrid 1792
The triumph of the castanets or My trip to Crotalópolis (1792), under the pseudonym Alexander Moya.
Currutaseos, science or ceremonial currutaca currutacos (1799).

Spanish male writers
1750 births
1819 deaths
University of Salamanca alumni